Wafadar Momand (born 1 February 2000) is an Afghan cricketer. He was one of the eleven cricketers to play in Afghanistan's first ever Test match, against India, in June 2018.

Domestic career
He made his List A debut for Boost Region in the 2017 Ghazi Amanullah Khan Regional One Day Tournament on 11 August 2017. He made his Twenty20 debut for Band-e-Amir Dragons in the 2017 Shpageeza Cricket League on 15 September 2017.

International career
In December 2017, he was named in Afghanistan's squad for the 2018 Under-19 Cricket World Cup.

In May 2018, he was named in Afghanistan's squad for their inaugural Test match, played against India. He made his Test debut for Afghanistan, against India, on 14 June 2018. During the match, he along with Rashid Khan, set a new record for becoming the first pair of teenagers to concede more than 100 runs each in their nation's inaugural Test match.

In July 2018, he was named in Afghanistan's One Day International (ODI) squad for their series against Ireland, but he did not play. In September 2018, he was named in Afghanistan's ODI squad for the 2018 Asia Cup. However, he was ruled out of the tournament after suffering an injury in a training session.

In December 2018, he was named in Afghanistan's under-23 team for the 2018 ACC Emerging Teams Asia Cup. In February 2019, he was named in Afghanistan's Test squad for their one-off match against Ireland in India. In November 2019, he was named in Afghanistan's squad for the 2019 ACC Emerging Teams Asia Cup in Bangladesh.

References

External links
 

2000 births
Living people
Afghan cricketers
Afghanistan Test cricketers
Band-e-Amir Dragons cricketers
Boost Defenders cricketers
People from Laghman Province